Jamie Scope (born 10 December 1986 in Newcastle upon Tyne) is an English footballer.

Career

College and amateur
From 2006 to 2010, Scope was a member of the University of the Incarnate Word Men's soccer team located in San Antonio, Texas. He served as team captain for two years and led the Cardinals to a conference championship in 2006, 2007, and 2008.

While at the University of the Incarnate Word, Scope was named the Heartland Conference Defender of the Year and First Team All-Conference in 2008 and 2009. He was also named a NSCAA All American in 2009.

During his college career, Scope also played with USL Premier Development League clubs Austin Aztex U23, Bakersfield Brigade and Ventura County Fusion.

Professional
Scope signed his first professional contract in March 2011, joining USL Pro club Wilmington Hammerheads. He made his professional debut on 28 May 2011, in a 0–0 tie with the Pittsburgh Riverhounds.

References

1986 births
Living people
English footballers
Incarnate Word Cardinals men's soccer players
Austin Aztex U23 players
Bakersfield Brigade players
Ventura County Fusion players
Wilmington Hammerheads FC players
USL League Two players
USL Championship players
Association football defenders
English expatriate sportspeople in the United States
Expatriate soccer players in the United States
English expatriate footballers